Infinite (stylised as infinite) is the twentieth studio album by English rock band Deep Purple, released on 7 April 2017.

Reception

A reviewer of Sputnikmusic commented "For all we know inFinite may very well be Deep Purple’s final stand and for what is worth, it cannot be compared with anything that the legendary act released in their heydays. However, try to think of bands that play like Deep Purple and you will probably fail to recognize even one. inFinite with all its limitations is an apotheosis of character and talent, the work of a group of men who feel comfortable in their own skin and comfortable with each other, which is weird to even fathom when we come to think of the history of the band. At the end of the day if this is how this story ends, it is a happy end after all." Paul Lester of Louder Sound stated "InFinite works best when Purple do what they do best: extrapolate and alchemize the blues and take it to new progressive heights".

Track listing

The Now What?! Live Tapes Vol. 2
This is three 10″ records of the April 2017 "Deluxe Box Set Edition"

Personnel
Ian Gillan – vocals
Steve Morse – guitars
Roger Glover – bass
Ian Paice – drums
Don Airey – keyboards
Additional musicians
Bob Ezrin – additional keyboards, backing vocals, percussion, production, mixing
Tommy Denander – additional guitar (track 8)

Production
Justin Cortelyou – engineer, mixing
Bryce Roberts – additional engineering
Crispin Day – additional vocal recordings
Trevor Anderson – additional vocal recordings
Cody Robertson – assistant engineering
Tommy Denander – additional engineering
Doron Plascow – additional engineering
Piers Mortimer – additional engineering

Charts

Weekly charts

Year-end charts

Certifications

References

2017 albums
Deep Purple albums
Edel AG albums
Albums produced by Bob Ezrin
Albums recorded at Noble Street Studios